Dhanya Rajendran is an Indian journalist and the co-founder and editor-in-chief of The News Minute. She previously worked with Times Now and The New Indian Express.

Career 
Dhanya Rajendran started her career by working for Kerala's first 24-hour news channel India Vision in 2003. In 2004, she moved to New Indian Express in Chennai. She subsequently moved to working for Times Now as a reporter in 2005 and went on to become its bureau chief of South India. Along with her husband Vignesh Vellore and Chitra Subramaniam, she then went on to co-found The News Minute, a digital news website focussing on the news coverage of the southern states of India in 2014. Dhanya is also a member of The Network for Women in Media, India.

Facing online harassment as a woman journalist 
Rajendran has often had to face online harassment on account of her work. In 2017, she faced a barrage of abuse on Twitter — all for expressing an opinion about Sura, a film she did not like. Her opinion about a Tamil film starring Vijay, a popular Tamil actor, angered his fans. Rajendran’s phone crashed after it couldn’t handle close to 31,000 tweets spread across a couple of minutes. #PublicityBeepDhanya—a hashtag was created just to abuse Rajendran— started trending. And choicest of abuses laden with sexual harassment followed.

Rajendran filed a complaint with the cyber crime branch of the Chennai police. In response, an FIR was filed under IPC sections 354 D (stalking), 506(1) (criminal intimidation), 507 (criminal intimidation by an anonymous communication), 509 (insulting the modesty of women), section 67 of IT Act (publishing obscene material), section 4 of TN Prohibition of Harassment of Women Act, and section 6 of the Indecent Representation of Women Act.

M. K. Stalin, the leader of the Dravida Munnetra Kazhagam also a issued a statement against the misogynistic threats. Despite deleting the original tweet, the violence continued. The Network for Women in Media, India and International Federation of Journalists issued statements in support of Rajendran and condemned the online harassment she had to face. Finally Vijay issued a statement asking his fans to stop the online harassment against Rajendran.

The Chennai police investigated Ramkumar, one of the accused, a Vijay fan and a Tamil Nadu resident in connection with the online harassment. He apologised for his deed after the police met his mother and the denial of his bail by the Madras High Court.

When she reported about godman Swami Nityananda being accused of sexual abuse, she had to face sexualized harassment on social media from the followers of Nithyananda's cult. In response to her reportage, the followers made several news videos by calling her choicest of abuses including presstitute, anti-national among others.

Rajendran has been vocal about online harassment faced by women journalists on the field. Immediately after former chief minister of Tamil Nadu J Jayalalitha's death, she wrote a piece about how she was molested by one of her security men when she was out to do stories around election coverage. She reacted strongly against the harassment faced by women journalists reporting about the entry of women in Sabarimala. In 2019, she issued a strong statement in support of women journalists protesting against harassment of the secretary of the Thiruvananthapuram Press Club against a woman journalist by saying: “If you touch one of us, we will retaliate. No longer your fiefdom.”  She has also come out in support of women sharing their stories during the Me too movement in India by consistently featuring several stories about the issue and also speaking out about it.

Against sensationalism 
Rajendran has also come out against sensationalism in news media by reflecting upon her own experiences as a journalist and the pressures that compel journalists to resort to digging out voyeuristic information in cases related to 'sexual abuse'. She has said that journalists should exercise restraint and shouldn't publish graphic details of a sexual crime since it is not of use to anyone, least of all to the victim or the survivor.

Awards and accolades 
Rajendran has amassed several awards in her career. She was named as one of India’s best entrepreneurs in Fortune magazine’s 40 under 40 list in 2018. Rajendran was also awarded Namma Bengaluru media person of the year in 2017.

Education 
Rajendran grew up in Palakkad, Kerala. She was educated at Kanikkamatha Convent School, Palakkad and at Government Victoria College, Palakkad. She is an alumnus of The Asian College of Journalism in Chennai.

References 

Indian newspaper journalists
Indian women journalists
Living people
Year of birth missing (living people)